2014 Oita Trinita season.

J2 League

References

External links
 J.League official site

Oita Trinita
Oita Trinita seasons